John Hamilton (1880 – after 1904) was illwalla Scottish footballer who played as a winger for West Ham United.

Footballing career
Born in Glasgow, Hamilton made his West Ham debut in December 1904 against Portsmouth. He made five appearances without scoring.

References

1880 births
Scottish footballers
Association football wingers
West Ham United F.C. players
Footballers from Glasgow
Date of death unknown
Date of birth unknown
Place of death missing